Stumpy is an album by New Zealand band Tall Dwarfs released in 1996. The album is officially credited to the "International Tall Dwarfs", because sounds on cassette by 16 home tapers from around the globe were used to create the music, including CJA. All songs were written by Bathgate and Knox.

Track listing
"Swan Song"
"They Like You, Undone"
"The Green, Green Grass Of Someone Else's Home"
"The Severed Head Of Julio"
"Crocodile"
"Macramé"
"Song Of The Jealous Lover"
"Honey, I'm Home"
"Jesus The Beast"
"Cruising With Cochran"
"Things"
"Mojave"
"Box Of Aroma"
"Ghost Town"
"Deep-Fried"
"Disoriented Bodgie"
"And That's Not All!!"
"Pull The Thread [& Unravel Me]"
"Dessicated" 
"Albumen"
"Two Minds"
"Up"

References

Tall Dwarfs albums
1996 albums
Flying Nun Records albums